Piers Anthony Dillingham Jacob (born 6 August 1934) is an American author in the science fiction and fantasy genres, publishing under the name Piers Anthony. He is best known for his long-running novel series set in the fictional realm of Xanth.

Many of his books have appeared on The New York Times Best Seller list, and he claims one of his greatest achievements has been to publish a book beginning with every letter of the alphabet, from Anthonology to Zombie Lover.

Early life
Anthony's parents, Alfred and Norma Jacob, were Quaker pacifists studying at Oxford University who interrupted their studies in 1936 to undertake relief work on behalf of the Quakers during the Spanish Civil War, establishing a food kitchen for children in Barcelona. Piers and his sister were left in England in the care of their maternal grandparents and a nanny. Alfred Jacob, although a British citizen, had been born in America near Philadelphia, and in 1940, after being forced out of Spain and with the situation in Britain deteriorating, the family sailed to the United States. In 1941 the family settled in a rustic "back to the land" utopian community near Winhall, Vermont, where a young Piers made the acquaintance of radical author Scott Nearing, a neighbor. Both parents resumed their academic studies, and Alfred eventually became a professor of Romance languages, teaching at a number of colleges in the Philadelphia area.

Piers was moved around to a number of schools, eventually enrolling in Goddard College in Vermont where he graduated in 1956. On This American Life on 27 July 2012, Anthony revealed that his parents had divorced, he was bullied, and he had poor grades in school. Anthony referred to his high school as a "very fancy private school", and refuses to donate money to it. He recalls being part of "the lower crust", and that no one paid attention to, or cared about him.  He said, "I didn't like being a member of the underclass, of the peons like that".

Marriage and early career
Anthony met his future wife, Carol Marble, while both were attending college. They were married in 1956, the same year he graduated from Goddard College, and he worked in a series of odd jobs. In 1957, Anthony decided to join the United States Army, as his wife was now pregnant, and they needed both medical coverage and a steady source of income. During his two-year enlistment, he became a naturalized U.S. citizen in 1958  and  became an editor and cartoonist for his battalion's newspaper.

After completing military service, he briefly taught school at Admiral Farragut Academy in St. Petersburg, Florida before deciding to try to become a full-time writer.

Anthony and his wife made a deal: if he could sell a piece of writing within one year, she would continue to work to support him. But if he could not sell anything in that year, then he would forever give up his dream of being a writer. At the end of the year, he managed to get a short story published. He credits his wife as the person who made his writing career possible, and he advises aspiring writers that they need to have a source of income other than their writing in order to get through the early years of a writing career.

Writing
On multiple occasions Anthony has moved from one publisher to another (taking a profitable hit series with him) when he says he felt the editors were unduly tampering with his work. He has sued publishers for accounting malfeasance and won judgments in his favor. Anthony maintains an Internet Publishers Survey in the interest of helping aspiring writers. For this service, he won the 2003 "Friend of EPIC" award for service to the electronic publishing community.  His website won the Special Recognition for Service to Writers award from Preditors and Editors, an author's guide to publishers and writing services.

His popular novel series Xanth has been optioned for movies. It inspired the DOS video game Companions of Xanth, by Legend Entertainment. The same series also spawned the board game Xanth by Mayfair Games.

Anthony's novels usually end with a chapter-long Author's Note, in which he talks about himself, his life, and his experiences as they related to the process of writing the novel. He often discusses correspondence with readers and any real-world issues that influenced the novel.

Since about 2000, Anthony has written his novels in a Linux environment.

Anthony's Xanth series was ranked No. 99 in a 2011 NPR readers' poll of best science fiction and fantasy books.

In other media
Act One of episode 470 of the radio program This American Life is an account of boyhood obsessions with Piers Anthony. The act is written and narrated by writer Logan Hill who, as a 12-year-old, was consumed with reading Anthony's novels. For a decade he felt he must have been Anthony's number one fan, until, when he was 22, he met "Andy" at a wedding and discovered their mutual interest in the writer. Andy is interviewed for the story and explains that, as a teenager, he had used escapist novels in order to cope with his alienating school and home life in Buffalo, New York. In 1987, at age 15, he decided to run away to Florida in order to try to live with Piers Anthony. The story includes Anthony's reflections on these events.

Naomi King, the daughter of writer Stephen King, enjoyed reading books by Piers Anthony, which included things like pixies, imps and fairies. After she told her father, "Dad, I just don't like those to be scared. Would you write something with dragons in it?", he wrote The Eyes of the Dragon which was originally published in 1984 and later in 1987 by Viking Press.

But What of Earth?
Early in Anthony's literary career, there was a dispute surrounding the original publication (1976) of But What of Earth?.  Editor Roger Elwood commissioned the novel for his nascent science-fiction line Laser Books. According to Anthony, he completed But What of Earth?, and Elwood accepted and purchased it. Elwood then told Anthony that he wished to make several minor changes, and in order not to waste Anthony's time, he had hired copy editor (and author) Robert Coulson to retype the manuscript with the changes. Anthony described Coulson as a friend and was initially open to his contribution.

However, Elwood told Coulson he was to be a full collaborator, free to make revisions to Anthony's text in line with suggestions made by other copy editors. Elwood promised Coulson a 50–50 split with Anthony on all future royalties. According to Anthony, the published novel was very different from his version, with changes to characters and dialog, and with scenes added and removed. Anthony felt the changes worsened the novel. Laser's ultimate publication of But What of Earth? listed Anthony and Coulson together as collaborators. Publication rights were reverted to Anthony under threat of legal action. In 1989, Anthony (re)published his original But What of Earth? in an annotated edition through Tor Books. This edition contains an introduction and conclusion setting out the story of the novel's permutations and roughly 60 pages of notes by Anthony giving examples of changes to plot and characters, and describing some of the comments made by copy editors on his manuscript.

Criticism
Some critics have described Anthony's portrayal of women characters as stereotypical and misogynist, particularly in the early parts of the Xanth series, and have taken issue with themes of underage sexuality and eroticism within Anthony's work.
Other critics note that he frequently defends pedophilia in books like Bio of a Space Tyrant and Firefly. In Bio, he stops the action to have a character talk nostalgically about her time as a child prostitute.

Anthony has argued in interviews that these critiques do not accurately reflect his work, and states that he gets more fan mail from female readers than male readers.

Personal life
Anthony lives on his tree farm in Florida.

He and his first wife, Carol Ann Marble Jacob, had two daughters, Penelope "Penny" Carolyn and Cheryl. Penny died in 2009, due to complications from skin cancer, and has one child named Logan. Carol Ann died at home on 3 October 2019 due to what is believed to have been heart related complications due to a 15 year long battle with chronic inflammatory demyelinating polyneuropathy (CIDP). 

On 22 April 2020, he married MaryLee Boyance.

Religious beliefs 
Regarding his religious beliefs, Anthony wrote in the October 2004 entry of his personal website, "I'm agnostic, which means I regard the case as unproven, but I'm much closer to the atheist position than to the theist one." In 2017 he stated, "I am more certain about God and the Afterlife: they don't exist."

Bibliography

References

External links

 
 Piers Anthony's page at Macmillan.com
 Extensive 2005 Interview
 
 
 
 

20th-century American novelists
20th-century American male writers
21st-century American novelists
American fantasy writers
American male novelists
American science fiction writers
Novelists from Florida
Admiral Farragut Academy alumni
British emigrants to the United States
American agnostics
1934 births
Living people
Goddard College alumni
United States Army soldiers
People from Oxford
English agnostics
English fantasy writers
English science fiction writers
American male short story writers
Westtown School alumni
20th-century American short story writers
21st-century American short story writers
21st-century American male writers
Naturalized citizens of the United States